The 2015 Tour de Taiwan was the thirteenth edition of the Tour de Taiwan cycling stage race. It started on 22 March and ended on 26 March, consisting of five stages and was rated as a 2.1 event on the 2015 UCI Asia Tour. The 2014 champion was Rémy Di Gregorio, but his team was not selected to take part in the 2015 edition.

The race was won by Samad Pourseyedi. He finished third on the first hill-top finish on stage 2, then took a solo victory on stage 4. He defended his lead to the end of the race. The final podium was made up entirely of Iranian riders: two  riders came second and third, Hossein Askari and Rahim Emami. Pourseyedi also won the mountains and Asian rider classifications, while  were the best team. The points competition was won by Patrick Bevin, who won one stage, was in the top ten in four stages and was fourth overall in the race. Two stages were won by Wouter Wippert and one by Tino Thömel.

Teams

Stages

Stage 1 

 22 March 2015 – Taipei to Taipei,

Stage 2 

 23 March 2015 – Taoyuan County to Taoyuan County,

Stage 3 

 24 March 2015 – Changhua County to Changhua County,

Stage 4 

 25 March 2015 – Sun Moon Lake to Tataka,

Stage 5 

 26 March 2015 – Jianshanpi Jiangnan Resort to Dapeng Bay,

References

External links 

 

Tour de Taiwan
Tour de Taiwan
Tour de Taiwan